Straumsnes may refer to the following locations:

Straumsnes, Møre og Romsdal, a village in Tingvoll municipality, Møre og Romsdal, Norway
Straumsnes (municipality), a former municipality now in Tingvoll municipality, Møre og Romsdal, Norway
Straumsnes, Bø, a village in Bø municipality, Nordland, Norway
Straumsnes, Fauske, a village in Fauske municipality, Nordland, Norway
Straumsnes, Narvik, a village in Narvik municipality, Nordland, Norway

See also
Straumnes
Stromness